Standing on the Edge is the third studio album by American country music artist John Berry. It was released in 1995 by Patriot Records. It peaked at number 12 on the Top Country Albums chart, and was certified Gold by the Recording Industry Association of America. The album includes the singles "Every Time My Heart Calls Your Name", "Standing on the Edge of Goodbye", "I Think About It All the Time" and "If I Had Any Pride Left at All", as well as a cover of Hank Snow's 1963 single "Ninety Miles an Hour."

Jim Ridley of New Country magazine gave the album three stars out of five. His review compares Berry's "anthemic songs of passion and romance" to the works of Meat Loaf, citing "Every Time My Heart Calls Your Name" and "If I Had Any Pride Left at All" as standouts, but calling "There's No Cross That Love Won't Bear" "the most godawful four minutes of lachrymose drivel since[…]the last big social statement song."

Track listing

Personnel

 Kenny Aronoff - drums
 Greg Barnhill - background vocals
 Eddie Bayers - drums
 John Berry - lead vocals
 Bill Cuomo - keyboards
 Dan Dugmore - steel guitar, dobro
 Tony Harrell - organ, Wurlitzer
 John Hobbs - piano
 John Barlow Jarvis - piano
 Chuck Jones - electric guitar
 Mary Ann Kennedy - background vocals
 Terry McMillan - percussion
 Kerry Marx - electric guitar
 Michael Rhodes - bass guitar
 Darrell Scott - background vocals
 Michael Spriggs - acoustic guitar
 Billy Thomas - background vocals
 Neil Thrasher - background vocals
 Billy Joe Walker Jr. - acoustic guitar
 Biff Watson - acoustic guitar
 Willie Weeks - bass guitar
 John Willis - electric guitar
 Lonnie Wilson - drums
 Glenn Worf - bass guitar
 Reggie Young - electric guitar

Charts

Weekly charts

Year-end charts

Certifications

References

1995 albums
John Berry (country singer) albums
Liberty Records albums
Albums produced by Jimmy Bowen